Wang-geon, the Great is a 1970 South Korean film directed by Choi In-hyeon, depicting the life of Wang-geon who ruled the Goryeo Dynasty.

Plot 
The film is about the life of General Wang-geon and how he becomes king of the Goryeo Dynasty after he killed the last king, Silla - Gu-jin.

Cast
Kim Myeong-jin
Shin Young-kyun 
Kim Ji-mee
Park Am
Heo Jang-kang
Ahn In-sook
Sa Mi-ja 
Kim So-eun 
Kim Dong-won 
Choi Seong-ho

See also
 Taejo Wang Geon (TV series)

External links 
 
 

1970 films
1970 war films
South Korean historical films
Films about politicians
Films set in the 10th century
Films set in the Goryeo Dynasty
1970s Korean-language films
Films set in Later Three Kingdoms
1970s historical films